The Slack is a  coastal river in the Pas-de-Calais department, in northern France.

It rises at Hermelinghen on Mount Binôt, flows through Rinxent, Marquise, Beuvrequen, Slack (village near Ambleteuse) and flows into the English Channel in Ambleteuse next to Fort Mahon.

References

Rivers of the Pas-de-Calais
Rivers of France
Rivers of Hauts-de-France
0Slack
Hauts-de-France region articles needing translation from French Wikipedia